3 Line or Line 3 may refer to:

Public transport

Asia
Line 3 (Chennai Metro), or Purple Line, under construction in India
Line 3 (Kolkata Metro), under construction in Kolkata, India.
Line 3 (Mumbai Metro), under construction in India
Line 3 (Pune Metro), under construction in India
Ampang Line or Line 3, in Klang Valley, Malaysia
MRT Line 3 (Metro Manila), Philippines
Busan Metro Line 3, in South Korea
Seoul Subway Line 3, in South Korea
Taipei Metro Line 3 or Songshan–Xindian or Green line, in Taiwan
Line 3 (Hanoi Metro) or Văn Miếu Line, under construction in Vietnam

China
Line 3 (Beijing Subway), a subway line under construction in Beijing
Line 3 (Changchun Rail Transit), a light rail line in Changchun, Jilin
Line 3 (Changsha Metro), a metro line in Changsha, Hunan
Line 3 (Chengdu Metro), a metro line in Chengdu, Sichuan
Line 3 (Chongqing Rail Transit), a monorail line in Chongqing
Line 3 (Dalian Metro), a metro line in Dalian, Liaoning
Line 3 (Dongguan Rail Transit), a planned metro line in Dongguan, Guangdong
Line 3 (Foshan Metro), a metro line in Foshan, Guangdong
Line 3 (Guangzhou Metro), a metro line in Guangzhou, Guangdong
Line 3 (Hangzhou Metro), a metro line in Hangzhou, Zhejiang
Line 3 (Harbin Metro), a metro line in Harbin, Heilongjiang
Line 3 (Hefei Metro), a metro line in Hefei, Anhui
Line 3 (Jinan Metro), a metro line in Jinan, Shandong
Line 3 (Kunming Metro), a metro line in Kunming, Yunnan
Line 3 (Nanchang Metro), a metro line in Nanchang, Jiangxi
Line 3 (Nanjing Metro), a metro line in Nanjing, Jiangsu
Line 3 (Nanning Metro), a metro line in Nanning, Guangxi
Line 3 (Ningbo Rail Transit), a metro line in Ningbo, Zhejiang
Line 3 (Qingdao Metro), a metro line in Qingdao, Shandong
Line 3 (Shanghai Metro), a metro line in Shanghai
Line 3 (Shenzhen Metro), a metro line in Shenzhen, Guangdong
Line 3 (Shijiazhuang Metro), a metro line in Shijiazhuang, Hebei
Line 3 (Suzhou Rail Transit), a metro line in Suzhou, Jiangsu
Line 3 (Tianjin Metro), a metro line in Tianjin
Line 3 (Wuhan Metro), a metro line in Wuhan, Hubei
Line 3 (Wuxi Metro), a metro line in Wuxi, Jiangsu
Line 3 (Xiamen Metro), a metro line in Xiamen, Fujian
Line 3 (Xi'an Metro), a metro line in Xi'an, Shaanxi
Line 3 (Xuzhou Metro), a metro line in Xuzhou, Jiangsu
Line 3 (Zhengzhou Metro), a metro line in Zhengzhou, Henan

Europe
Line 3 (Athens Metro), a metro line of the Athens Metro, Athens, Greece
Line 3 (Budapest Metro), a subway line of the Budapest Metro, Budapest, Hungary
Line 3 (Madrid Metro), a metro line of the Madrid Metro, Madrid, Spain
Line 3 (Metrovalencia), in Valencia, Spain
Line 3 (Moscow Metro), the Arbatsko-Pokrovskaya line in Moscow, Russia
Line 3 (Saint Petersburg Metro)
Île-de-France tramway Line 3, a modern tramway in Paris
Paris Métro Line 3, a line of the Paris Métro rapid transit system in France
U3 (Vienna U-Bahn), a subway line of Vienna U-Bahn, Vienna, Austria

North America

Canada
Line 3 Scarborough in Toronto
Line 3 Red (Montreal Metro), proposed but not built

Mexico
Mexico City Metro Line 3, a rapid transit line in Mexico City

United States
Route 3 (MTA Maryland), a bus route
3 (New York City Subway service), a rapid transit service
3 (Los Angeles Railway), former streetcar service

South America
Line 3 (Metrovía), a bus route in Guayaquil, Ecuador
Line 3 (São Paulo Metro), Brazil
Santiago Metro Line 3, in Chile

See also  
Enbridge Line 3, a proposed tar sands oil pipeline
 3 Train (disambiguation)
3-line, a name for the Russian Mosin–Nagant rifle
Three-line whip, an instruction from a  whip to vote in the UK parliament